The Henry C. and Wilhemina Bruening House is a house located in north Portland, Oregon, listed (since November 27, 2004) on the National Register of Historic Places.

See also
 National Register of Historic Places listings in North Portland, Oregon

References

1910 establishments in Oregon
Bungalow architecture in Oregon
Houses completed in 1910
Houses on the National Register of Historic Places in Portland, Oregon
Humboldt, Portland, Oregon
North Portland, Oregon